Mario Humberto Lobo (born August 21, 1964 in San Salvador de Jujuy, Argentina) is an Argentine former footballer. He played for clubs in Argentina, Chile and Peru.

Teams
 Gimnasia y Esgrima (J) 1986-1987
 Independiente 1987-1989
 Sporting Cristal 1990
 Independiente 1990-1991
 Gimnasia y Esgrima (J) 1992-1995
 Santiago Wanderers 1996
 Gimnasia y Esgrima (J) 1997-2000
 Chacarita Juniors 2000-2001
 Atlético Tucumán 2001-2002
 Gimnasia y Esgrima (J) 2002-2004
 Altos Hornos Zapla 2005

Titles
 Gimnasia y Esgrima (J) 1993-1994 (Primera B Nacional Championship)

External links
 Profile at BDFA 
 Profile at Futbol XXI  
 Profile at Argentinesoccer

1964 births
Living people
Argentine footballers
Argentine expatriate footballers
Gimnasia y Esgrima de Jujuy footballers
Club Atlético Independiente footballers
Chacarita Juniors footballers
Atlético Tucumán footballers
Sporting Cristal footballers
Santiago Wanderers footballers
Chilean Primera División players
Argentine Primera División players
Expatriate footballers in Chile
Expatriate footballers in Peru
Association football forwards
Sportspeople from Jujuy Province